Line 21 of the Shenzhen Metro is an express line under planning, which will connect across Shenzhen through the districts of Nanshan, Longhua and Longgang for 66 kilometers and 26 stations. Construction is planned to begin in 2023. The line is proposed to use 8 car type A trains.

Stations (Phase 1)

References

Shenzhen Metro lines
Transport infrastructure under construction in China